Pablo Machón is a libre/free knowledge activist, libre/free software developer and founding member and President of the Free Knowledge Foundation, an organization that promotes people's rights and freedoms relating knowledge, software and data/information standards. He is the Spanish Team Coordinator and former vice-president of the Free Software Foundation Europe, and he is a visible free software political advocate and activist, speaking for freedom in the digital age in various international events, and organizations.

He specializes in fostering free knowledge and free software in politics, and in the business and public administration sectors.

He speaks fluent Spanish and English.

References

External links
 Free Knowledge Foundation
 Free Knowledge Foundation alternate page
 FKF Team (in Spanish)
 Free Software Foundation Europe
 Pablo Machón personal web site

Living people
Free software programmers
Year of birth missing (living people)